The Moronidae are a family of perciform fishes, commonly called the temperate basses, consisting of at least six freshwater, brackish water, and marine species. Many members of this family are anadromous.

Description
These fishes reach 45 cm to one meter long and silvery in colour, with seven or eight longitudinal stripes on the flanks. The body is moderately elongated, and somewhat flattened on the sides. The head and body are covered with large comb scales. They have two short spines on the gill cover. The gill cover is round and slightly sawn. The mouth is large, the maxillary is extended, and there is no supramaxillary. There are rows of small, conical teeth in the mouth. Special fangs are missing. The base of the tongue is also provided with two rows of small teeth, and there are teeth on the skull (vomer) and the palatine bone (palatine). The number of branchiostegal rays is seven. Of a total of 25 vertebrae, 12 are trunk vertebrae and 13 are tail vertebrae located behind the anus.

The lateral line organ is continuous and extends to the base of the caudal fin. It is accompanied by 50 to 72 pored scales. The swim bladder extends into a cavity of the first fin ray carrier (pterygiophore) of the anal fin.

The dorsal fin is clearly divided by an indentation. The last fin spine is in the second dorsal fin. The anal fin lies below or behind the soft-rayed part of the dorsal fin. The pectoral fins are small and asymmetrical, the upper rays are longer. The caudal fin is forked and heavily scaled at its base. It is supported by eight to nine fin rays, seven to eight of which are branched.

Fins formula: dorsal 1 VIII – X, dorsal 2 I / 10–13, anal III / 9–12, pectoral 15–18, ventral I / 5

Genera
The members of this family are most commonly found near the coastal regions of eastern North America (including the Gulf of Mexico), northern Africa, and Europe.  The family includes the genera Morone and Dicentrarchus.

Asian seabasses, Lateolabrax spp., are sometimes placed in this family instead of their own family, the Lateolabracidae; this would increase the species number of this family to eight.

They are highly prized as sport fish.

Timeline

References

 
Percoidei
Ray-finned fish families
Taxa named by David Starr Jordan